Father Rufinus Widl (26 September 1731 – 12 March 1798) was a Bavarian Benedictine monk and a lecturer at Salzburg University from 1767 until his death.

Widl was born in Frauenwörth, Frauenchiemsee, Bavaria. He wrote a dissertation on Elementibus logicae in 1751. His most famous work today is the opera Apollo et Hyacinthus to music by Mozart; it was an entr'acte to a play performed by students at the university, Clementia Croesi, which was also written by Father Widl, and first performed in 1767. Widl died in Obing, Bavaria.

References

Further reading
 Thomas Lederer, "The clemency of Rufinus Widl: Text and context of W. A. Mozart's first opera." Humanistica Lovaniensia 58 (2009), 217-373. (Textus Clementiae Croesi et Apollinis et Hyacinthi cum versionibus Anglice recensis) 
 Albert Orel, Apollo et Hyacinthus. Neue Mozart-Ausgabe II/5/1. Kassell: Bärenreiter, 1990.

External links 
 
 

1731 births
1798 deaths
Austrian Benedictines
Austrian opera librettists